"Destiny Calling" is a song written by Kristofer Östergren and recorded by Swedish band Melody Club on the 2006 album Scream. In November 2006 the song was released as a single and pekaed at 15th position at the Swedish singles chart.

Chart positions

Weekly charts

Year-end charts

References

2006 singles
2006 songs
Melody Club songs